Adamstown is an unincorporated community and census-designated place (CDP) in Frederick County, Maryland, United States. It is named for Adam Kohlenberg (March 11, 1819 – January 1, 1868), a station agent and first town merchant who owned much of present-day Adamstown. As of the 2010 census, the Adamstown CDP had a population of 2,372.

History 
Adamstown lies in the fertile valley between Sugarloaf and Catoctin Mountain on the former Carrollton Manor, a  estate originally owned by Charles Carroll of Carrollton. Until 2000, it was a little-altered representative of mid-19th century linear town planning. It is significant in architecture for its variety of structures, including residential, commercial, industrial, educational, agricultural, and religious buildings. The late 18th century road from Jefferson to Greenfield Mills on the Monocacy River, originally called the Bridal Road, followed the route of the present-day Mountville Road. The 1832 arrival of the railroad to the manor created the economic and transportation impetus for the development of the community. 

Adamstown was first known as "Davis' Warehouse" because Dr. Meredith Davis, a leading Quaker county miller, built a warehouse about 1835 where Mountville Road, by then called Jefferson Road, crossed the Baltimore & Ohio Railroad ( southwest of Frederick) to store flour from his Greenfield Mills. The first settler in Adamstown was Robert Palmer, an African American "post and railer" who also ran a general store around 1835. In 1840 when Adam Kohlenburg was appointed the first B&O railway agent, the community became known as "Adamstown", after his given name. He was also the first postmaster and ran a general store located in the lot between his brick Italianate-style home and the railroad. Edward Hebb laid off lots on the north side of the railroad in the 1840s. Daniel Rhodes of Pennsylvania, the first white settler, was so impressed with the location, he bought a tract of land and laid it off into 12 building lots on the south side of the railroad in 1856.

With Adamstown located so close to the Potomac River and Virginia, its citizens were almost exclusively loyal to the South during the Civil War; however, both Federal and Confederate troops were constantly moving on Carrollton Manor. For several months in the spring of 1861, the Minute Men of Adamstown, a secession militia company composed of three officers (Captain Robert H. E. Boteler, 1st Lieutenant Jacob G. Thomas, and 2nd Lieutenant William Hilleary Johnson, all local doctors) planted a pole and flew the Confederate flag adjacent to their guard post next to the B&O railroad. Many skirmishes in the war were fought here and the town was often raided, most notoriously by the 43rd Battalion Virginia Cavalry, also known as Mosby's Rangers, on July 30 and October 14, 1864. On one of these raids, Adam Kohlenburg's entire stock was taken. Local folklore holds that one family had a son fighting for the North and one fighting for the South.

In 1902, Jacob Klein's Addition to Adamstown included the area of Washington, Adams, and Tuscarora streets. The Adamstown Bank was established in 1917, and the building opened in 1919. In 1921, Adamstown had two large grain elevators (Farmers Exchange of Frederick and Thomas & Co.), a blacksmith shop, a carriage works, two garages, a general store, a hardware store, a butcher shop and the bank. Electric lights were first installed in the town in 1921 as well.

Culture

The largest area-wide event is the Carroll Manor Fire Company Carnival, which is held every June.

Demographics 

Three new developments with a total of 540 homes have been constructed in Adamstown since 2000 (Green Hill Manor, Saddle Ridge and Adamstown Commons).

The population in 1880 was 66 and approximately 500 in 1971. As of the census of 2000, there were 2,920 people, 1,049 households and 829 families residing in Adamstown. The racial makeup of the county was 92.7% White, 4.9% Black or African American, 0.2% Native American, 0.7% Asian, 0.0% Pacific Islander, 0.2% from other races, and 1.3% from two or more races. 1.6% of the population were Hispanic or Latino of any race.

There were 1,049 households, out of which 36.4% had children under the age of 18 living with them, 69.3% were married couples living together, 5.8% had a female householder with no husband present, and 21.0% were non-families. 20.10% of all households were made up of individuals, and 9.1% had someone living alone who was 65 years of age or older. The average household size was 2.77 and the average family size was 3.12.

Adamstown's population was spread out, with 28.8% under the age of 19, 2.9% from 20 to 24, 29.4% from 25 to 44, 24.3% from 45 to 64, and 14.5% who were 65 years of age or older. The median age was 39.5 years. For every 100 females, there were 96.46 males. For every 100 females age 18 and over, there were 97 males.

Business 
The largest local business is Trans-Tech, which manufactures RF microwave components. Other businesses in Adamstown Proper along Mountville Rd include Stups Market, Garden and Vintage Goods @ Adamstown, C&H Supply Company, Italia New York Pizza II, DeFrehn Consulting Investment Advisory Service, Brittany DeFrehn Photography and Elegant Forever Bridal Shop. Eastalco, an aluminum smelting plant, curtailed operations in December 2005 when it was unable to continue purchasing electricity at a price they could afford due to electric deregulation in the State of Maryland. Eastalco is in the process of dismantling its plant and selling the property.

Education 
Carroll Manor Elementary School services area children from pre-kindergarten through 5th grade. The school also houses part of Frederick County's Challenges Program, a special program for children with autism and other severe communication disorders, and a special education pre-kindergarten. The school is supported by the Carroll Manor Elementary School PTA. Current school district boundaries designate Ballenger Creek Middle School and Tuscarora High School for continued education.

Geography 
Adamstown is located in southern Frederick County at 39°18.675' North, 77°28.504' West (39.311233, −77.475067).

Highways
 Maryland Route 85

References

Note: In order to access click on the link, log on as a guest, and re-enter the link in the address bar to access the report.

External links 
 Adamstown community website (under construction)
 Carroll Manor Fire Company 

Census-designated places in Maryland
Census-designated places in Frederick County, Maryland
Railway stations in the United States opened in 1832